Héctor Giménez may refer to:

 Héctor Giménez (baseball) (born 1982), Venezuelan professional baseball catcher
 Héctor Giménez (footballer) (born 1975), Uruguayan-Mexican football striker